Rezende is a surname. Notable people with the surname include:

Ana Rezende (born 1983), Brazilian film director and keyboard/guitar player
Antônio Alberto Guimarães Rezende (1926–2015), Brazilian Roman Catholic bishop
Arthur Rodrigues Rezende (born 1994), Brazilian footballer
Bernardo Rezende (born 1959), Brazilian volleyball player and coach
Bruno Rezende (born 1986), Brazilian volleyball player
Calvin Rezende (born 1993), American soccer player
Daniel Rezende (born 1975), Brazilian film editor and director
Daniel Rezende Xavier (born 1982), Brazilian archer
Denis Neves Rezende da Silva (born 1990), Brazilian footballer
Gílson Domingos Rezende Agostinho (born 1977), Brazilian footballer
Iris Rezende (born 1933), Brazilian politician
José Rezende Filho (1929–1977), Brazilian writer
Luciano Rezende (born 1978), Brazilian Paralympic archer
Manoel Rezende de Mattos Cabral, also known as Nelinho, (born 1950), Brazilian footballer
Marcelo Rezende (1951–2017), Brazilian journalist and television presenter
Marisa Rezende (born 1944), Brazilian music educator and composer
Marlon Rezende Emídio Costa (born 1995), Portuguese footballer
Mônica Rezende (born 1969), Brazilian swimmer
Nico Rezende, Brazilian singer, composer and musical arranger
Renato Rezende (born 1991), Brazilian racing cyclist
Roberto de Sousa Rezende (born 1985), Brazilian footballer
Sérgio Rezende (born 1951), Brazilian filmmaker
Tiago Marques Rezende (born 1988), Brazilian footballer
Rezende (footballer) (born 1995), Brazilian footballer

See also
Rezendes, another surname